Cochrane South was an electoral riding in Ontario, Canada. It represented in the Legislative Assembly of Ontario from 1926 to 1999. It encompassed the southern part of the Cochrane District, including the city of Timmins.

For the 1999 election, in which all electoral districts in the province were realigned to match their federal counterparts, Cochrane South was divided between the new districts of Timmins—James Bay and Timiskaming—Cochrane.

Members of Provincial Parliament

Election results

References

Former provincial electoral districts of Ontario